The Central Bank of Barbados (CBB) is the national monetary authority and central bank responsible for providing advice to the Government of Barbados on banking and other financial and monetary matters. The Central Bank of Barbados, was established by Act of parliament on 2 May 1972. Prior to the establishment of CBB, Barbados' monetary policies were governed through its membership in the Eastern Caribbean Currency Authority (ECCA).  The Central Bank operates as the banknote issuing authority for Barbadian currency.

The name of the Central Bank's building is the Tom Adams Financial Centre, which is a ten-storey building located on Spry Street in Bridgetown. As part of the complex, there is a 491-seat theatre/auditorium known as the Frank Collymore Hall. The building was constructed between 1982 and 1986 and it was opened September 18, 1986.

The Global Competitiveness Report for 2008–09 ranked the soundness of Barbados's commercial banks as 21st out of 134 global jurisdictions assessed.

Role
At its inception the Central Bank of Barbados had certain objectives.

These were:
 Promoting monetary stability
 Promoting a sound financial structure
 Fostering development of the money and capital markets
 Channelling commercial bank credit into productive activities
 Fostering credit and exchange conditions conducive to the orderly and sustained economic development of Barbados.

Today the regulatory capacity of the central bank handles the issuance of Barbadian banknotes and coins, and licensing of agencies such as: banks, investment businesses, depository trust and finance companies. It also undertakes supervision of Barbadian financial institutions, credit worthiness of the financial system, administering of the international reserves, and reporting regularly to the country on the national finances.

The Barbadian economy is reviewed regularly by several notable Wall Street investment firms including: PricewaterhouseCoopers, Standard & Poor's, and Moody's.

Organisation

The head of the Central Bank is the governor, who is appointed by the Minister of Finance.
The current governor of the Central Bank of Barbados is Mr. Cleviston Haynes as of January 2018 (he was acting Governor since March 2017).

The Bank also has two Deputy Governors in the persons of Mrs. Michelle Doyle Lowe and Mr. Michael D Carrington, both in acting capacities. The CEO is Kevin Gill effective April 1, 2021.

Past Central Bank Governors
Sir Courtney Blackman (founding Governor, June 1972 – March 1987)
Dr Kurleigh King (September 1987 – September 1992)
Mr Calvin Springer (September 1992 – September 1997)
Mr Winston Cox (September 1997 – April 1999)
Dr Marion Vernese Williams (April 1999 – November 2009)
Dr DeLisle Worrell (November 2009 – March 2017)

Awards of the CBB
 The Frank Collymore Literary Endowment

See also

 Barbadian dollar
 Banks of Barbados
 Ministry of Finance, Economic Affairs and Investment (Bardados)
 Economy of the Caribbean
 Securities commission
 Commonwealth banknote-issuing institutions
 List of financial regulatory authorities
 Central banks and currencies of the Caribbean

References

External links

Frank Collymore Hall at the CBB
Former Barbadian banknotes (historic)

Banks of Barbados
Barbados
1972 establishments in Barbados
Banks established in 1972